Roman Kirn was the ambassador of the Republic of Slovenia to the United States, Mexico and The Netherlands. He was appointed Ambassador of Slovenia to the United States of America on May 26, 2009 and to the United  Mexican States on January 20, 2011. From 22 July 2002 until December 2006, he was permanent Representative (or ambassador) of Slovenia to the United Nations. Prior to that appointment, at Slovenia's Ministry of Foreign Affairs, he served as State Undersecretary and Head of the Multilateral Relations Department. He was Ambassador of Slovenia to the Kingdom of The Netherlands from 16 October 2013 until June 2017.

References

  "CURRICULUM VITAE Mr. Roman Kirn ", The Embassy of the Republic of Slovenia Washington. URL last accessed 2 May 2011.
  "Chapter VIII of the UN Charter Needed A More Open-minded Interpretation", The United Nations Chronicle. URL last accessed 25 March 2006.

Living people
Slovenian diplomats
Permanent Representatives of Slovenia to the United Nations
Ambassadors of Slovenia to the United States
Ambassadors of Slovenia to Mexico
1952 births